Hongshuia megalophthalmus is a species of cyprinid fish in the genus Hongshuia endemic to China. It is sometimes placed in the genus Sinocrossocheilus.

References 

Hongshuia
Fish described in 2006